Rachel Rosing is a 1935 novel by the British writer Howard Spring. It is the sequel to Shabby Tiger, published the previous year (1934).

References

Bibliography
 George Watson & Ian R. Willison. The New Cambridge Bibliography of English Literature, Volume 4. Cambridge University Press, 1972.

1935 British novels
Novels by Howard Spring
Novels set in Manchester
William Collins, Sons books